Tun Sambanthan Monorail station, is a Malaysian elevated monorail station that forms a part of the Kuala Lumpur Monorail (KL Monorail) line located in Kuala Lumpur and opened alongside the rest of the line and other adjoining monorail stations on August 31, 2003.

Situated at the south side of the Jalan Tun Sambanthan 4-Jalan Tebing (Malay; English: Tun Sambanthan Road 4-River Bank Road) intersection in the Brickfields district of Kuala Lumpur, the station resides at the western bank of the Klang River (or the left bank of the river), just beside Methodist College Kuala Lumpur (MCKL), and the Malaysian Association of the Blind (MAB) opposite Jalan Tun Sambanthan 4. The station is situated close to a pedestrian bridge that crosses the Klang River, connecting the area to Jalan Syed Putra (Syed Putra Road) that adjoins the Federal Highway and the Kuen Cheng High School just opposite the river. The station has only one exit which connects to the west side of Jalan Tebing.

The station is named after V. T. Sambanthan, a notable figure in the Malaysian Indian Congress. Jalan Tun Sambanthan (Tun Sambanthan Road), a main road in Brickfields, is also named after V. T. Sambanthan and is the location of the preceding KL Sentral monorail terminus.

Layout

Exits and Entrances
The station has only one exit.

See also
 List of rail transit stations in Klang Valley

References 

Kuala Lumpur Monorail stations
Railway stations opened in 2003